The Chongqing–Changsha high-speed railway is a high-speed railway line in the People's Republic of China currently under construction. It will start at Changsha South and stop at Chongqing. It is part of the Xiamen–Chongqing Passageway, which is one of the national "Eight Vertical and Eight Horizontal" high-speed railway network lines announced in 2016.

The line will run at a designed speed of between 200 and 250 km/h and will be 339 km long. The project will be completed by 2020. Construction began in October 2014.

References

See also 
 High-speed rail in China

High-speed rail in China